Irina Carmen Petrescu (19 June 1941 – 19 March 2013) was a Romanian film actress. She appeared in 29 films between 1959 and 2010. She won the award for Best Actress at the 6th Moscow International Film Festival for her role in the 1969 film A Woman for a Season.

Early life and career 
She was born in 1941 in Bucharest, the daughter of Constantin and Elena Petrescu. She graduated from the Institute of Theatre and Film I.L. Caragiale, class of 1963, under the guidance of teachers  and David Esrig. Irina Petrescu was noticed one day by director , who came to her table in the Continental restaurant and asked her to audition for his film. The film has not done, but the audition was shown to Liviu Ciulei, who searched for – and found – an interpreter for Ana's role in "Waves of the Danube". At that time Petrescu was only 17 years old.

In 2000, Petrescu was awarded by Romanian President Emil Constantinescu the Order of the Star of Romania, Officer class.

She died in 2013 at  after a long battle with breast cancer, and was buried at the Reînvierea Cemetery in the Colentina neighborhood of Bucharest.

Selected filmography
  (1959)
  (1961), as Rodica Barbu
 Poveste sentimentală (1961)
  (1963), as Artemis
  (1964), as the student Sonia Mureșan
 The White Moor (1965)
 Story of My Foolishness (1966), as Jacqueline
 Sunday at Six (1966)
  (1967), as the librarian Mariana
  (1967), as the chemist Magdalena
 A Woman for a Season (1969), as Ana Patriciu
  (1971), as Eva
  (1974), as the violinist Corina
  (1976), as the nun Aegidia
 Miss Christina (1992)
 The Human Resources Manager (2010)

References

External links

1941 births
2013 deaths
Actresses from Bucharest
Romanian film actresses
Romanian television actresses
Romanian stage actresses
Caragiale National University of Theatre and Film alumni
Officers of the Order of the Star of Romania